Rhigiocarya is a genus of flowering plants belonging to the family Menispermaceae.

Its native range is Western and Western Central Tropical Africa.

Species:

Rhigiocarya peltata 
Rhigiocarya racemifera

References

Menispermaceae
Menispermaceae genera